Sunita Mani (born December 13, 1986) is an American actress, dancer and comedian. She is best known for her television roles as Trenton in the USA Network drama Mr. Robot (2015–2017) and Arthie Premkumar in the Netflix comedy GLOW (2017–2019). Mani played the lead roles in the 2020 films Save Yourselves! and Evil Eye.

Life and career
Mani was born to Tamil parents hailing from Tamil Nadu, India.

She graduated from Dickson County High School in Dickson, Tennessee in 2004.

After studying writing at Emerson College, where she gained experience in stand-up comedy, Mani joined the Upright Citizens Brigade for three years, where she learned more about improv. She began her acting career by appearing in the MTV web TV pilot Writer's Block, and in commercials for Burger King and Levi's. 

Her first film appearance was in The Unspeakable Act (2012), an American coming-of-age drama written and directed by Dan Sallitt which won the Sarasota Film Festival's Independent Visions Award. Mani gained public recognition for her dance performance in the music video for the song "Turn Down for What", released in December 2013. She appeared in the drama–thriller television series Mr. Robot as Trenton. In 2016, she appeared in Don't Think Twice, an episode of Broad City, and episodes of The Good Place. She was cast in the 2017 Netflix series GLOW.

Mani is a member of the alt-comedy group Cocoon Central Dance Team.

Filmography

Film

Television

Short videos

Music videos

References

External links
 

Living people
1986 births
American female dancers
American film actresses
21st-century American actresses
American television actresses
American actresses of Indian descent
American people of Indian Tamil descent
Place of birth missing (living people)
21st-century American dancers